Swamp she-oak is a common name for several plants and may refer to:

Allocasuarina paludosa, endemic to southeastern Australia
Casuarina glauca
Casuarina obesa, native to southwestern Australia